|}

The Junior Jumpers Membership Fillies' Juvenile Handicap Hurdle is a Grade 3 National Hunt hurdle race in Great Britain which is open to fillies aged four years. It is run on the New Course at Cheltenham over a distance of about 2 miles and 1 furlong (2 miles and 179 yards, or 3,382 metres), and during its running there are eight hurdles to be jumped. It is a handicap race for juvenile novice hurdlers, and it is scheduled to take place each year during April.

The race was first run in 2018 and was raised to Grade 3 in 2019.

Winners

See also
 Horse racing in Great Britain
 List of British National Hunt races

References 

Racing Post: 

National Hunt hurdle races
Cheltenham Racecourse
Recurring sporting events established in 2018
2018 establishments in England
National Hunt races in Great Britain